Yana Urqu (Quechua yana black, urqu mountain, "black mountain", Hispanicized spelling Yana Orjo) is a mountain in the Chunta mountain range in the Andes of Peru, about  high. It is located in the Huancavelica Region, Castrovirreyna Province, Santa Ana District. Yana Urqu lies south of Wayra Q'asa.

References

Mountains of Huancavelica Region
Mountains of Peru